The Army Records Society is a text publication society for the history of the British Army. The society was established in 1984 and is a registered charity. To date (October 2022) the society has issued 41 volumes of material.

Selected publications

18th Century volumes
 An Eighteenth-Century Secretary at War: The Papers of William, Viscount Barrington (ed. Dr Tony Hayter, 1988) vol. 4 
 Colonel Samuel Bagshawe and the Army of King George II, 1731-1762 (ed. Dr Alan J. Guy, 1990) vol. 6 
 John Peebles’ American War, 1776-1782 (ed. Professor Ira D. Gruber, 1998) vol. 13 
 The Journal of Corporal William Todd, 1745-1762 (eds. Andrew Cormack & Alan Jones, 2001) vol. 18 
 Amherst and the Conquest of Canada	(ed. Dr Richard Middleton, 2003) vol. 20 
 The Duke of Cumberland's Campaigns in Britain and the Low Countries, 1745-1748: A Selection of His Letters (eds. Alastair Massie & Jonathan Oates, 2018) vol. 38

19th Century volumes
 The Napoleonic War Journal of Captain Thomas Henry Browne, 1807-1816 (ed. Professor Roger Norman Buckley, 1987) vol. 3 
 Roberts in India: The Military Papers of Field Marshal Lord Roberts, 1876-1893 (ed. Brian Robson, 1993) vol. 9 
 Lord Chelmsford’s Zululand Campaign, 1878-1879 (ed. Professor John Laband, 1994) vol. 10 
 Letters of a Victorian Army Officer: Edward Wellesley, 1840-1854 (ed. Field Marshal Michael Carver, 1995) vol. 11  
 The Maratha War Papers of Arthur Wellesley, January to December 1803	(ed. Anthony S. Bennell, 1998) vol. 14  
 Sir Hugh Rose and the Central India Campaign, 1858 (ed. Brian Robson, 2000) vol. 16  
 At Wellington’s Right Hand: The Letters of Lieutenant-Colonel Sir Alexander Gordon, 1808-1815 (ed. Dr Rory Muir, 2003) vol. 21  
 Romaine’s Crimean War: The Letters and Journal of William Govett Romaine 1854-6 (ed. Major Colin Robins OBE, 2005) vol. 24  
 Wolseley and Ashanti: The Asante War Journal and Correspondence of Major General Sir Garnet Wolseley 1873-1874	(ed. Professor Ian F. W. Beckett, 2009) vol. 28  
 Crimean Cavalry Letters (ed. Glenn Fisher, 2011) vol. 31

20th Century volumes
 The Military Correspondence of Field Marshal Sir Henry Wilson, 1918-1922 (ed. Dr Keith Jeffery, 1985) vol. 1 
 The Army and the Curragh Incident, 1914 (ed. Professor Ian F. W. Beckett, 1986) vol. 2 
 The Military Correspondence of Field Marshal Sir William Robertson, Chief of the Imperial General Staff, December 1915-February 1918 (ed. Professor David Woodward, 1989) vol. 5 
 Montgomery and the Eighth Army: A Selection from the Diaries, Correspondence and other Papers of Field Marshal the Viscount Montgomery of Alamein (ed. Stephen Brooks, 1991) vol. 7 
 The British Army and Signals Intelligence during the First World War (ed. Dr John Ferris, 1992) vol. 8 
 The Letters of Lieutenant-Colonel Charles à Court Repington CMG, Military Correspondent of The Times, 1903-1918 (ed. Professor A. J. A. Morris, 1999) vol. 15 
 Lord Roberts and the War in South Africa, 1899-1902 (ed. Professor André Wessels, 2000) vol. 17 
 Rawlinson in India (ed. Dr Mark Jacobsen, 2002) vol. 19 
 Allenby in Palestine (ed. Dr Matthew Hughes, 2004) vol. 22 
 Lord Kitchener and the War in South Africa, 1899-1902 (ed. Professor André Wessels, 2006) vol. 25 
 Major General Oliver Nugent and the Ulster Division, 1915-1918 (ed. Nicholas Perry, 2007) vol. 26 
 Montgomery and the Battle of Normandy (ed. Stephen Brooks, 2008) vol. 27 
 The First World War Letters of General Lord Horne (ed. Dr Simon Robbins, 2009) vol. 29 
 The Military Papers of Lieutenant-Colonel Sir Cuthbert Headlam, 1910-1942 (ed. Dr Jim Beach, 2010) vol. 30 
 The Military Papers of Lieutenant-General Frederick Stanley Maude, 1914-1917 (ed. Dr Andrew Syk, 2011) vol. 32 
 The Kenya Papers of General Sir George Erskine 1953-1955 (ed. Dr Huw Bennett & Professor David French, 2013) vol. 33 
 Military Intelligence from Germany 1906-1914 (ed. Matthew S. Seligmann, 2014) vol. 34 
 The Diary of Corporal Vince Schürhoff 1914-1918 (ed. Jim Beach, 2015) vol. 35 
 Liaison: General Pierre des Vallières at British General Headquarters, January 1916 to May 1917 (ed. Elizabeth Greenhalgh, 2016) vol. 36 
 The Military Papers and Correspondence of Major-General J. F. C. Fuller, 1916-1933 (ed. Dr Alaric Searle, 2017) vol. 37 
 Lord Gorell and the Army Education Corps 1918-1920 (ed. Dr Jim Beach, 2019) vol. 39 
 The Military Papers of Field Marshal Sir Claude Auchinleck, Volume 1: 1940-42 (ed. Timothy Bowman, 2021) vol. 40 
 The First World War Diary of Noël Drury, 6th Royal Dublin Fusiliers: Gallipoli, Salonika, the Middle East and the Western Front (ed. Richard S. Grayson, 2022) vol. 41

Miscellaneous
 Military Miscellany I: Manuscripts from the Seven Years' War, the First and Second Sikh Wars, and the First World War (eds. Alan J. Guy, R. N. W. Thomas & Gerard J. DeGroot, 1996) vol. 12 
 George Durant’s Journal of the Expedition to Martinique and Guadeloupe, 1758-1759 (ed. Dr Alan J. Guy)
 Daniel Robinson: Letters from India, 1845-1849	(ed. Dr Robin N. W. Thomas)
 The Reverend George Duncan at GHQ, 1916-1918 (ed. Dr Gerard DeGroot)
 Military Miscellany II: Manuscripts from Marlborough's Wars, the American War of Independence, and the Boer War (eds. David Chandler with Christopher Scott, Marianne M. Gilchrist & Robin Jenkins, 2005) vol. 23 
 The Journal of Sergeant John Wilson, 1694-1727 (ed. Dr David Chandler with Christopher Scott)
 Captain the Hon William Leslie (1751-1777), His Life, Letters and Commemoration (ed. Dr Marianne M. Gilchrist)
 Diary of Private Robert Cross, 1899-1901	(ed. Robin Jenkins)

References 

1984 establishments in the United Kingdom
History of the British Army
Text publication societies